Child slavery is the slavery of children. The enslavement of children can be traced back through history. Even after the abolition of slavery, children continue to be enslaved and trafficked in modern times, which is a particular problem in developing countries.

History
Child slavery refers to the slavery of children below the age of majority. Many children have been sold into slavery in the past for their family to repay debts or crimes or earn some money if the family were short of cash. A scholar retold a story about a mother where "her predicament shattered the privilege of thinking of her children in purely personal and sentimental terms and caused her to consider whether outsiders might find value in them". Harriet Beecher Stowe wrote about a woman a slave owner bought to breed children to sell. The expectations of children who were either bought or born into slavery varied. Scholars noted, "age and physical capacity, as well as the degree of dependence, set the terms of children's integration into households".

The duties that child slaves were responsible for performing are disputed amongst scholars. A few representations of the lives that slave children led portrayed them as, "virtually divorced from the plantation economy until they were old enough to be employed as field hands, thereby emphasizing the carefree nature of childhood for a part of the slave population that was temporarily spared forced labor". This view also stated that if children were asked to perform any duties at all, it was to perform light household chores, such as being "organized into 'trash gangs' and made to collect refuse about the estate". Opposing scholars argued that slave children had their youth stolen from them, and were forced to start performing adult duties at a very young age. Some say that children were forced to perform field labor duties as young as the age of six. It is argued that in some areas children were put to "regular work in the antebellum South" and it "was a time when slaves began to learn work routines, but also work discipline and related punishment".

A degree of self-possession was present in some degree to adults, but "children retained the legal incapacities of dependence even after they had become productive members of households". It was reported by scholars that, "this distinctive status shaped children's standing within familial households and left them subject to forced apprenticeship, even after emancipation". There were slave owners who did not want child slaves or women who were pregnant for fear that the child would have "took up too much of her time".

The conditions of slavery for pregnant women varied regionally. In most cases, women worked in the fields up until childbirth performing small tasks. "four weeks appears to have been the average confinement period, or 'lying-in period', for antebellum slave women following delivery in the South as a whole". Slaveholders in northern Virginia, however, usually only permitted an average lying-in period of about "two weeks before ordering new mothers back to work". The responsibility of raising and tending to the children then became the task of other children and older elderly slaves. In most institutions of slavery throughout the world, the children of slaves became the property of the owner. This created a constant supply of people to perform labor. This was the case with, for example, thralls and American slaves. In other cases, children were enslaved as if they were adults. Usually, the mother's status determined if the child was a slave, but some local laws varied the decision to the father. In many cultures, slaves could earn their freedom through hard work and buying their own freedom.

Modern day
Although the abolition of slavery in much of the world has greatly reduced child slavery, the problem lives on, especially in developing countries. According to the Anti-Slavery Society, "Although there is no longer any state which legally recognizes, or which will enforce, a claim by a person to a right of property over another, the abolition of slavery does not mean that it ceased to exist. There are millions of people throughout the world—mainly children—in conditions of virtual to slavery." It further notes that slavery, particularly child slavery, was on the rise in 2003. It points out that there are countless others in other forms of servitude (such as peonage, bonded labor and servile concubinage) which are not slavery in the narrow legal sense. Critics claim they are stretching the definition and practice of slavery beyond its original meaning and are actually referring to forms of unfree labour other than slavery. In 1990, reports of slavery came out of Bahr al Ghazal, a Dinka region in southern Sudan. In 1995, Dinka mothers spoke about their abducted children. Roughly 20,000 slaves were reported in Sudan in 1999. "The handmade woolen carpet industry is extremely labor-intensive and one of the largest export earners for India, Pakistan, Nepal and Morocco." During the past 20 years, about 200,000 and 300,000 children are involved, most of them in the carpet belt of Uttar Pradesh in central India. Many children in Asia are kidnapped or trapped in servitude, where they work in factories and workshops for no pay and receive constant beatings. Slaves have reappeared following the old slave trade routes in West Africa. "The children are kidnapped or purchased for $20–$70 each in poorer states, such as Benin and Togo, and sold into slavery in sex dens or as unpaid domestic servants for $350.00 each in wealthier oil-rich states, such as Nigeria and Gabon."

Trafficking

Trafficking of children includes recruiting, harbouring, obtaining, and transporting children by use of force or fraud for the purpose of subjecting them to involuntary acts, such as commercial sexual exploitation (including prostitution) or involuntary labour, i.e., enslavement. Some see human trafficking as the modern form of slavery. Human trafficking is the trade of human beings and their use by criminals to make money. The majority of trafficking victims are adults, predominantly made up of women forced into prostitution, but children make up many victims forced into prostitution.

In Ukraine, a survey conducted by the non-governmental organization (NGO) La Strada-Ukraine in 2001–2003, based on a sample of 106 women being trafficked out of Ukraine found that 3% were under 18, and the US State Department reported in 2004 that incidents of minors being trafficked was increasing. In Thailand, NGOs have estimated that up to a third of prostitutes are children under 18, many trafficked from outside Thailand.

The United Nations Special Rapporteur on the sale of children, child prostitution and child pornography estimates that about one million children in Asia alone are victims of the sex trade.

Following the 2010 Haiti earthquake, Save the Children, World Vision and the British Red Cross have called for an immediate halt to adoptions of Haitian children not approved before the earthquake, warning that child traffickers could exploit the lack of regulation. An Office of the United Nations High Commissioner for Human Rights spokesman said that child enslavement and trafficking was "an existing problem and could easily emerge as a serious issue over the coming weeks and months".

Child soldiers

The United Nations defines child soldiers as "A child associated with an armed force or armed group refers to any person below 18 years of age who is, or who has been, recruited or used by an armed force or armed group in any capacity, including but not limited to children, boys and girls, used as fighters, cooks, porters, spies or for sexual purposes." In 2007, Human Rights Watch estimated that 200,000 to 300,000 children served as soldiers in current conflicts. In 2012, this estimation rose to be around 300,000 in only twenty countries. Around 40% of child soldiers are believed to be girls, that have been taken and used as sex slaves and 'wives'.

Forced labor
More girls under 16 work as domestic workers than any other category of child labor, often sent to cities by parents living in rural poverty such as in restaveks in Haiti.

See also
Andrew Forrest
Children's Care International or Aide Internationale Pour l'Enfance (AIPE-CCI)
Contemporary slavery
Military use of children
Walk Free Foundation

Notes

External links
Anti-Slavery Society
BBC – Help for Gulf child camel jockeys
NY Times – Robot Jockeys
BBC – Child camel jockeys find hope
Ansar Burney Trust – brought world attention to the plight of child camel jockeys and rescued hundreds of children from camel farms; operates shelter homes for trafficked victims; persuaded governments of Qatar and UAE to ban use of children as camel jockeys in 2005.
Sport of Sheikhs – Emmy and duPont award-winning documentary on camel jockeys in the Middle East
Every Child Ministries—child slaves
Trafficking in Minors – United Nations Interregional Crime and Justice Research Institute
ECPAT international
'Tracking Africa's child trafficking – BBC
'Child traffic victims 'failed'- BBC
Fears of rising child sex trade – The Guardian

Child abuse
Slavery
Child labour
Human rights articles needing expert attention